LogicVision, Inc. was an electronic design automation (EDA) company, offering chip, board and system-level Design for Test (DFT) solutions and support to ASIC vendors based in San Jose, California, United States. Founded in 1992, it was acquired by Mentor Graphics in 2009. Their embedded test, BIST and yield learning tools were applicable to digital, analog and mixed-signal designs.  LogicVision had no profitable year during its existence as a publicly traded company.

History
The company was founded as LV Software in 1992 by Vinod Agarwal, a former McGill University professor in electrical engineering. Later that year, LV Software was renamed as LogicVision. The company became publicly traded in October 2001 on the  NASDAQ as LGVN, and in  November 2004 they acquired SiVerion. Founder Vinod Agarwal resigned as chairman of the board in November 2005. On August 18, 2009, Oregon based Mentor Graphics acquired LogicVision in an all-stock arrangement valued at $13 million. Mentor incorporated LogicVision as part of an existing business unit.

LogicVision tool suites
 ETCreate — Embedded test IP insertion tool for logic, memory and mixed-signal testing
 ETAccess —  Interactive program that works with 3rd party testers for controlling and logging of data on the device for at-speed testing
 SiVision —  Yield analysis program which looks at foundry and performance data to diagnose possible problems

Management team
 James T. Healy, President and CEO
 Bruce M. Jaffe, Vice President of Finance and Chief Financial Officer
 Ron H. Mabry, Vice President of Field Operations and Applications Engineering
 Farhad Hayat, Vice President of Marketing
 Benoit Nadeau-Dostie, Ph.D., Chief Scientist

References

External links
LogicVision homepage

Electronic design automation companies
Companies based in San Jose, California